MaliVai "Mal" Washington (born June 20, 1969) is an American former professional tennis player. He reached the men's singles final at Wimbledon in 1996, won four ATP titles and achieved a career-high singles ranking of world No. 11 in October 1992.

Family
Washington began playing tennis aged five. Washington's younger sister, Mashona, is also a former top-50 professional tennis player. His younger brother, Mashiska, received All-America honors at Michigan State University, before joining the men's professional tour. MaliVai's older sister Michaela also played professionally.

Amateur tennis
As a high school senior, Washington was coached by former ATP Tour participant Victor Amaya. For two seasons, Washington played tennis for the University of Michigan and was the top ranked college player in the United States at the end of his sophomore season. He left college two years into his studies to pursue a professional tennis career.

Professional career
Washington turned professional in 1989. In 1990, while ranked no. 103, he defeated world number 2 Ivan Lendl in New Haven (6–3, 6–2).

During his breakthrough year in 1992, Washington won the Memphis title (defeating seventh-seeded Wayne Ferreira in the final) and the U.S. Men's Clay Court Championships in Charlotte, North Carolina, winning the final against Claudio Mezzadri. He reached a career high ranking of 11 in October.

In 1993, Washington reached his first Masters final in Miami, losing to Pete Sampras in straight sets.

At the 1994 Australian Open, Washington reached his first Grand Slam quarterfinal, after a win over second-seeded Michael Stich in the first round and a five-set victory against Mats Wilander in the fourth round. He also had wins over Michael Chang and Stefan Edberg during the US Summer hard court season, and won his third ATP-title in Ostrava in October.

In 1995, he beat world no. 1 Andre Agassi in the third round of the Essen Masters on his way to the final (where he lost to Thomas Muster).

Washington's biggest success at a Grand Slam event came in 1996 when he was a runner-up at the Wimbledon Championships. On his way to the final he defeated ninth-seeded Thomas Enqvist in the second round, and came back from a 1–5 deficit in the fifth set of the semifinal to beat Todd Martin, finally winning 10–8. Before the tournament had started, his odds of winning the title were 300–1. He eventually lost the final to Richard Krajicek. He gained revenge against Krajicek in the Grand Slam Cup in October later that year, beating him for the loss of just three games (6–1, 6–2).

Washington suffered from a recurring knee injury from the beginning of 1997, causing him to miss most of the 1997 and 1999 seasons, and precipitating his retirement in December 1999.

Awards
In 2009 Washington won the ATP Arthur Ashe Humanitarian of the Year award, for his positive work through the MaliVai Washington Youth Foundation.

In 2015 Washington won the NJTL Founders' Service Award (The USTA's National Junior Tennis League), for his continued contribution since retirement to support education and tennis among children and young people (particularly those underprivileged).

Grand Slam finals

Singles: 1 (1 runner-up)

ATP Tour finals

Singles (4 titles, 9 runner-ups)

Doubles (1 runner-up)

Performance timeline

Singles

* Washington withdrew prior to his second-round match at the 1998 Australian Open

Wins over Top 10 players

References

External links
 
 
 
 MaliVai Washington Kids Foundation website

1969 births
Living people
African-American sports journalists
American sports journalists
African-American male tennis players
American male tennis players
American color commentators
Hopman Cup competitors
Michigan Wolverines men's tennis players
Olympic tennis players of the United States
Sportspeople from Glen Cove, New York
People from Ponte Vedra Beach, Florida
Sportspeople from Flint, Michigan
Tennis commentators
Tennis people from Michigan
Tennis people from New York (state)
Tennis players at the 1996 Summer Olympics
21st-century African-American people
20th-century African-American sportspeople